The following is a list of subcamps of the Majdanek concentration camp run by Nazi Germany in occupied Poland during World War II. The list, supplied by the Majdanek State Museum, identifies two German categories of the KL Lublin/Majdanek subcamps; the Arbeitzlagers, and the so-called Kommandos. The satellite camps were named Aussenlager (external camp), Nebenlager (extension or subcamp), and Arbeitslager (labor camp). Some of them were less than ten kilometers away from the main camp, with prisoner populations ranging from several dozens to several thousand.

Around 1943 the SS put a number of separate camps under the command of the Majdanek administration including Trawniki, Krasnik, Pulawy and Poniatowa concentration camps. However, a similar plan to include the Kraków-Płaszów concentration camp in the list was never realized partly because of the Sobibor extermination camp uprising in the vicinity. Plaszow remained an independent Konzentrationslager associated with Auschwitz.

Subcamps of Majdanek 
Guarded by the SS division of the Totenkopfverbände, the known sub-camps of KL Majdanek included:

See also
Trawniki concentration camp 
Poniatowa concentration camp 
History of the Lublin Airport
Lipowa camp of the Lublin Ghetto
Subcamp (SS)

References

 Państwowe Muzeum na Majdanku (The Majdanek State Museum) official website.
 Internet portal "KL Lublin" 
 Towarzystwo Opieki nad Majdankiem – Oddział w Białymstoku (The Society for the Preservation of Majdanek) official website.

Majdanek concentration camp
World War II sites in Poland
Majdanek